William Gilbey is a British screenwriter.

Gilbey works frequently with his brother, film director Julian Gilbey, and is best known for such films as Reckoning Day, Rollin' With The Nines, Rise of the Footsoldier, Doghouse and A Lonely Place to Die.

In 2013 he co-wrote the international thriller Plastic with Julian Gilbey and Chris Howard.

Personal life

His great-grandfather was British actor Nigel Bruce.

Filmography
 Reckoning Day (2000)
 Rollin' With The Nines (2005)
 Rise of the Footsoldier (2007)
 A Lonely Place to Die (2010)
 Plastic (2013) - Editor/Writer
 Once Upon a Time in London (2017) - Writer
 Jericho Ridge (TBA) - Writer and director

References

External links

1979 births
Living people
British male screenwriters